The 1914 Boston Braves season was the 44th season of the franchise. The team finished first in the National League, winning the pennant by 10½ games over the New York Giants after being in last place in the NL at midseason. The team, which became known as the 1914 Miracle Braves, went on to sweep the Philadelphia Athletics in the 1914 World Series.

Offseason 
 Prior to 1914 season: Guy Zinn jumped from the Braves to the Baltimore Terrapins.

Regular season 
The Braves performed one of the most memorable reversals in major league history, going from last place to first place in two months, becoming the first team to win a pennant after being in last place on the Fourth of July. After finishing in fifth place in 1913 with a record of 69 wins and 82 losses, the Braves were not expected to be contenders. They spent the first part of the season in last place, posting a record of 26 wins and 40 losses in early July. Led by three pitchers, Dick Rudolph, Bill James, and Lefty Tyler, the team began to win games, taking over first place for good on September 8. Their record over their final 87 games was 68–19 for a winning percentage of .782. Infielders Johnny Evers and Rabbit Maranville led the league in double plays. The Braves went on to sweep Connie Mack's heavily favored Athletics in four games in the 1914 World Series. The team became known as the "Miracle" Braves and remain one of the most storied comeback teams in baseball history. The franchise would not win another pennant until 1948.

Season standings

Record vs. opponents

Roster

Player stats

Batting

Starters by position 
Note: Pos. = Position; G = Games played; AB = At bats; R = Runs; H = Hits; HR = Home runs; RBI = Runs batted in; Avg. = Batting average; SB = Stolen bases

Other batters 
Note: G = Games played; AB = At bats; H = Hits; Avg. = Batting average; HR = Home runs; RBI = Runs batted in

Pitching

Starting pitchers 
Note: G = Games pitched; IP = Innings pitched; W = Wins; L = Losses; ERA = Earned run average; SO = Strikeouts

Other pitchers 
Note: G = Games pitched; IP = Innings pitched; W = Wins; L = Losses; ERA = Earned run average; SO = Strikeouts

1914 World Series 

Boston Braves (4) vs Philadelphia Athletics (0)

Notes

References 
1914 Boston Braves season at Baseball Reference
"The 1914 Miracle Braves – 50 Years Later!", Baseball Digest, Oct 1964

Boston Braves seasons
Boston Braves
Boston Braves
1910s in Boston
National League champion seasons
World Series champion seasons